Yarn  is a type of textile used for knitting. 

Yarn may also refer to:

 Shaggy dog story, a long-winded anecdote also known as a yarn
 YARN, a software utility that is part of the  Apache Hadoop collection
 Yarn, in Australian Aboriginal English, to share stories, sometimes for healing purposes (yarning circle)
 Yarn (package manager), a software packaging system for the Node.js JavaScript runtime environment.
 Yarn (music group), a New York band